The 1969 Navy Midshipmen football team represented the United States Naval Academy (USNA) as an independent during the 1969 NCAA University Division football season. The team was led by first-year head coach Rick Forzano.

Schedule

Personnel

References

Navy
Navy Midshipmen football seasons
Navy Midshipmen football